United Nations Security Council resolution 1492, adopted unanimously on 18 July 2003, after recalling all previous resolutions on the situation in Sierra Leone, the council approved a four-stage reduction of the United Nations Mission in Sierra Leone, culminating in a complete withdrawal by December 2004.

The Security Council recognised the fragile security situation in the Mano River region, notably the civil war in neighbouring Liberia and the need to strengthen the capacity of the Sierra Leone Police and Armed Forces. It approved of the Secretary-General Kofi Annan's decision concerning the drawdown of the United Nations Mission in Sierra Leone by the end of 2004. The Secretary-General submitted additional recommendations in early 2004 regarding a residual United Nations presence in Sierra Leone.

Key benchmarks of the reduction were to be monitored by the council, while the Secretary-General was instructed to report at the end of each of the four phases on progress made.

See also
 List of United Nations Security Council Resolutions 1401 to 1500 (2002–2003)
 Sierra Leone Civil War
 Special Court for Sierra Leone

References

External links
 
Text of the Resolution at undocs.org

 1492
2003 in Sierra Leone
 1492
Sierra Leone Civil War
July 2003 events